Bantam Press is an imprint of Transworld Publishers which is a British publishing division of Penguin Random House.

It is based on Uxbridge Road in Ealing near Ealing Broadway station, London, the same address as Transworld.

Bantam Press also publishes Sophie Kinsella's Shopaholic books.

External links
Transworld website

Book publishing companies of the United Kingdom